"Never Stop" is a single which was released by the British post-punk band Echo & the Bunnymen on 8 July 1983. It reached number fifteen on the UK Singles Chart the same month. The title track on the 12-inch single is a remixed version called "Never Stop (Discotheque)" and is another minute and fifteen seconds longer.

The b-side of the 7-inch single is "Heads Will Roll" and the b-sides of the 12-inch single are an expanded version called "Heads Will Roll (Summer Version)" and "The Original Cutter". While Hugh Jones produced the a-side, the b-sides were produced by Ian Broudie under the pseudonym Kingbird.

Primarily released as a single, the  12" extended version of "Never Stop" also appeared on the 12-inch mini-album The Sound of Echo. It was subsequently included on the 2003 remastered version of the Porcupine album as well as a number of compilation albums. "Never Stop (Discotheque)" was also used in the 2006 film The History Boys and was included on the subsequent soundtrack album.

Track listings
All tracks written by Will Sergeant, Ian McCulloch, Les Pattinson and Pete de Freitas.

7" release (Korova KOW 28 and WEA 24.9712-7)
"Never Stop" – 3:31
"Heads Will Roll" – 3:29

12" release (Korova KOW 28T and WEA 24-9711-0)
"Never Stop (Discotheque)" – 4:46
"Heads Will Roll (Summer Version)" – 4:23
"The Original Cutter – A Drop in the Ocean" – 3:59

Chart positions

Personnel

Musicians
Ian McCulloch – vocals, guitar
Will Sergeant – lead guitar
Les Pattinson – bass
Pete de Freitas – drums, xylophone, conga

Production
Hugh Jones – producer
Ian Broudie – producer
David Balfe – mixed by ("Never Stop (Discotheque)")
The Bunnymen – mixed by ("Never Stop (Discotheque)")

References

Sources

1983 singles
Echo & the Bunnymen songs
Songs written by Ian McCulloch (singer)
Songs written by Will Sergeant
Songs written by Les Pattinson
Songs written by Pete de Freitas
1983 songs